The Taichung City Seaport Art Center is an art center in Qingshui District, Taichung, Taiwan.

History
The construction of the center began in 1993. It was then officially opened in March 2000.

Architecture
The center was constructed with a Southern Fujian architectural style and courtyard space with a total floor space of 30,394 m2. It consists of the exhibition hall, concert hall, Taichung City artists archives, conference hall, recreation area and open air stage, arts and crafts classrooms and administration offices.

Transportation
The center is accessible within walking distance northwest of Qingshui Station of Taiwan Railways.

References

External links
 

2000 establishments in Taiwan
Art centers in Taichung
Buildings and structures completed in 2000